Sandra Regina de Midence is a Honduran politician, and was the President of the Central Bank of Honduras under the interim government of Roberto Micheletti. She was the deputy minister of finance from 1998 to 2000 under the presidency of Carlos Flores.

References

Living people
Presidents of the Central Bank of Honduras
Government ministers of Honduras
20th-century Honduran women politicians
20th-century Honduran politicians
Year of birth missing (living people)
21st-century Honduran women politicians
21st-century Honduran politicians
Women government ministers of Honduras